Access All Arenas is the second live album by French house music duo Justice. It was released on 7 May 2013. The album was recorded at the Arena of Nîmes on 19 July 2012.

Release
Initially, the song "On'n'On" was released on the official Justice YouTube channel on 26 March 2013 as a promotion for the full album. The album was released on streaming services such as Spotify and their own official website for the album on 2 May 2013, while distribution mediums such as Amazon.com or iTunes released the album on the official date of 7 May 2013.

Critical reception

The album received generally positive reviews upon release. Pitchfork praised how the music had unmistakable flaws indicative of live performance, noting that this gives the album "an organic energy" in contrast with other dance acts where pre-sequenced music would play. Pitchfork also noted how they recorded tones of crowd noise, concluding that "even if you weren't there to appreciate the show in person, they'll make damn sure you know that 2,000 others did." Consequence of Sound, in a three-star review, praised the variety of styles in the album, saying "Access All Arenas threads seamlessly from one track into the next, touching upon everything from Zeppelin-like riffage (“Canon”) and cock rock bombast (“Newlands”) to slick odes to ’70s funk and disco (“D.A.N.C.E.”), all underpinned by an omnipresent house beat." PopMatters also commented on the performance aspect, expressing that "Justice actually does its best to play the music, rather than leaning on Ableton or some other digital interface to spit out slightly modified stems". PopMatters also mentioned similarities between this album and Audio, Video, Disco, Justice's last album.

Track listing

References

Ed Banger Records albums
Justice (band) albums
2013 live albums